Lasioglossum alphenum, also known as the Lasioglossum (Sudila) alphenum by Sakagami et al. (1996), is a species of bee in the genus Lasioglossum, of the family Halictidae.

References
 https://www.academia.edu/7390502/AN_UPDATED_CHECKLIST_OF_BEES_OF_SRI_LANKA_WITH_NEW_RECORDS
 https://www.itis.gov/servlet/SingleRpt/SingleRpt?search_topic=TSN&search_value=757951
 http://animaldiversity.org/accounts/Lasioglossum_alphenum/classification/#Lasioglossum_alphenum
 https://www.uniprot.org/uniprot/Q8MW13
 https://web.archive.org/web/20150216144957/http://www.gbif.org/species/119887313

Notes

alphenum
Insects described in 1897